Protoploea apatela, the magpie, is a species of nymphalid butterfly in the Danainae subfamily.

It is monotypic within the genus Protoploea.

Distribution
Protoploea apatela is endemic to montane New Guinea island, found in Papua New Guinea, and in Western New Guinea of Indonesia.

It is a near threatened species on the IUCN Red List.

References

Danainae
Butterflies of Oceania
Insects of Papua New Guinea
Insects of Western New Guinea
Endemic fauna of Indonesia
Endemic fauna of Papua New Guinea
Butterflies described in 1925

Taxonomy articles created by Polbot